Andrea Gámiz and Adriana Pérez were the defending champions, having won the previous event in 2011, but both players chose not to participate.

The second seeds Lara Arruabarrena and Florencia Molinero won the title, defeating Melanie Klaffner and Patricia Mayr-Achleitner in the final, 6–2, 6–0.

Seeds

Draw

References 
 Draw

Seguros Bolivar Open Bogota - Doubles
Seguros Bolívar Open Bogotá